Muhić is a Croatian and Bosniak surname. Notable people with the surname include:

 Enes Muhić (born 1961), Bosnian footballer
 Ferid Muhić (born 1944), Bosniak philosopher
 Pavao Muhić (1811–1897),  Croatian lawyer and politician

Bosnian surnames
Croatian surnames